Zach Hocker was born in August 23, 1991. He is a former American football placekicker. He was drafted by the Washington Redskins in the seventh round of the 2014 NFL Draft. He has also played for the Miami Dolphins, New Orleans Saints, St. Louis Rams, Cincinnati Bengals, and Tampa Bay Buccaneers.

Early life 
Hocker was a two-time All-State player at Russellville High School in Arkansas and was inducted into the school's Athletic Hall of Fame.  He played college football at the University of Arkansas from 2010 to 2013 and made 61 of 79 field goal attempts during that time.

Professional career

Washington Redskins
Hocker signed a four-year, $2.1 million contract with the Washington Redskins on May 16, 2014, but was released on August 30, 2014 during final roster cuts before the start of the 2014 season in favor of Kai Forbath.

Miami Dolphins
Hocker signed a futures contract with the Miami Dolphins on January 8, 2015, but was waived three months later.

New Orleans Saints
On May 17, 2015, the New Orleans Saints signed Hocker, who beat out Dustin Hopkins to start the 2015 season as the Saints kicker. However, Hocker went on to miss 4 of 13 field goals over the first six games of the season, including a potentially game-winning field goal against the Dallas Cowboys in Week 4. The Saints consequently released Hocker on October 19, 2015 and signed Forbath. Forbath had earlier been released by the Washington Redskins and been replaced with Hopkins, whom Hocker beat in camp. ESPN referred to the situation as a continuation of the "NFL's kicking carousel."

St. Louis Rams
On November 28, 2015, Hocker signed with the St. Louis Rams after their regular kicker, Greg Zuerlein, was injured. Hocker was active in two games before Zuerlein returned, and was released on December 15, 2015.

Cincinnati Bengals
On January 5, 2016, the Cincinnati Bengals signed Hocker to a futures contract. On August 29, 2016, Hocker was waived by the Bengals.

Tampa Bay Buccaneers
On August 13, 2017, Hocker was signed by the Tampa Bay Buccaneers. He was released on September 2, 2017.

References

External links
Arkansas Razorbacks bio

1991 births
Living people
American football placekickers
Washington Redskins players
New Orleans Saints players
Arkansas Razorbacks football players
Players of American football from Arkansas
People from Russellville, Arkansas
Miami Dolphins players
St. Louis Rams players
Cincinnati Bengals players
Tampa Bay Buccaneers players
People from Pope County, Arkansas